The 2011 South American Championships in Athletics were the 47th edition of the South American Championships, organised under the supervision of the CONSUDATLE. They were held at the National Center of High Performance Athletics (Centro Nacional de Alto Rendimiento Deportivo, CeNARD) in Buenos Aires, Argentina from 2 to 5 June 2011. Forty-four track and field events were contested, with the number of contests split evenly between the sexes. A total of 345 athletes participated at the championships.

It was the first time since 1967 that the city had hosted the event. Brazil continued its dominance at the continental competition, winning the most medals of the fourteen participating countries (51 in total, 21 of them gold). It also retained both the men's and women's title on points. Colombia was the next most successful nation, taking twelve gold medals and thirty-three overall, while the host nation Argentina came third with five golds and twenty medals altogether.

In the events, two South American records were set in the men's and women's 20,000 m track walk competition. Although cold weather conditions affected performances, a total of eight Championships records were improved over the course of the four-day competition, which also saw ten national records beaten.

On the first day, Brazil's Fabiana Murer won the women's pole vault in a championship record, while Argentine Jennifer Dahlgren achieved the same feat in the women's shot put. Reigning Olympic champion Maurren Maggi won her sixth title in the long jump. On day two Juan Ignacio Cerra won his ninth hammer throw gold medal in the history of the event, while Luiz Alberto de Araújo made his breakthrough in the men's decathlon – a championship record of 7944 points made him the fourth best South American of all time.

The women's track events on day three saw Ana Cláudia Silva complete a sprint double over 100 and 200 metres. Rosibel García did the middle-distance equivalent, taking the titles over 800 and 1500 metres. On the final day, Simone da Silva of Brazil won the women's 10,000 metres in 31:59.11 minutes, making her the second fastest South American runner over the distance.

Records

Medal summary

Men's results

Track

Field

Women's results

Track

Field

Medal table

Points table

''Note: Points are scored by athlete's finishing positions in event finals. All data from official website.

Participating nations
 (71) (Host nation)
 (1)
 (11)
 (78)
 (34)
 (56)
 (22)
 (3)
 (25)
 (15)
 (1)
 (13)
 (15)

References 

Day reports
Biscayart, Eduardo (2011-06-02). Murer vaults to world season leading 4.70m in Buenos Aires - South American Championships Day 1. IAAF. Retrieved on 2011-06-05.
Biscayart, Eduardo (2011-06-04). Cerra wins ninth Hammer Throw title in Buenos Aires – South American Champs Day 2. IAAF. Retrieved on 2011-06-05.
Biscayart, Eduardo (2011-06-05). Windy 14.59m Triple Jump for Ibargüen in Buenos Aires – South American Champs, Day 3. IAAF. Retrieved on 2011-06-05.
Biscayart, Eduardo (2011-06-06). Brazil retains South American title in Buenos Aires – Final Day. IAAF. Retrieved on 2011-06-06.

External links 
 
 

2011
 Sports competitions in Buenos Aires
South American
Athletics
International athletics competitions hosted by Argentina
2011 in South American sport